Nima Doroudi (born 	January 9, 1997) is an Iranian football forward who currently plays for Aluminium Arak in the Persian Gulf Pro League.

References

Living people
People from Sanandaj
1997 births
Association football forwards
Iranian footballers
Aluminium Arak players
Kurdish sportspeople
Iranian Kurdish people
Persian Gulf Pro League players